Acordulecerinae is a subfamily of sawflies in the family Pergidae. There are about 16 genera and more than 100 described species in Acordulecerinae.

Genera
These 16 genera belong to the subfamily Acordulecerinae:

 Acordulecera Say, 1836
 Acorduloceridea Rohwer, 1912
 Anathulea Malaise, 1942
 Busalus Smith, 1990
 Caloperga Naumann, 1983
 Ceratoperia Enderlein, 1919
 Corynophilus Kirby, 1882
 Enjijus Smith, 1990
 Giladeus Brèthes, 1920
 Krausius Smith, 2006
 Leptoperga Riek, 1970
 Phylacteophaga Froggatt, 1899
 Quetutus Smith, 1990
 Sutwanus Smith, 1990
 Tequus Smith, 1990
 Truqus Smith, 1990

References

External links

Tenthredinoidea